Takashi Kitamura (born 15 May 1977) is a Japanese skier. He competed in the Nordic combined event at the 2006 Winter Olympics.

References

1977 births
Living people
Japanese male Nordic combined skiers
Olympic Nordic combined skiers of Japan
Nordic combined skiers at the 2006 Winter Olympics
Sportspeople from Niigata Prefecture